Listroteuthis is a genus of muensterellid stem-octopod from the Moernsheim Formation of Germany. It is monotypic, with only type species L. conica known.

References 

Taxa described in 1922
Octopuses
Prehistoric cephalopod genera